Hueso may refer to:

Ben Hueso (born 1969), American politician
Cayo Hueso, Spanish name for Key West, Florida, US
Cayo Hueso, Havana, consejo popular (ward) in Havana, Cuba
Hueso Parado, village in Arizona, US
Manuel Vázquez Hueso (born 1981), Spanish road racing cyclist
Palo y hueso, 1968 Argentine film